Charles Harvey Sells (September 29, 1889 – January 26, 1978) was the New York State Superintendent of Public Works from May 20, 1943 to September 30, 1948.

References

New York State Superintendents of Public Works
1889 births
1978 deaths
People from Lewisboro, New York
20th-century American politicians